Joe Clifford Faust (born 1957) is an American author best known for his seven science fiction novels primarily written during the 1980s and 1990s, including A Death of Honor, The Company Man, the Angel's Luck Trilogy (all published by Del Rey Books), and the satirical Pembroke Hall novels (published by Bantam Spectra). His novels are known for their tightly controlled plots and their sense of humor.

Like many authors, he draws inspiration from previous and current occupations, including projectionist, record store clerk, radio announcer, sheriff's dispatcher, and advertising copywriter. He currently works as a freelance writer alongside other creative projects such as occasional forays into cartooning and songwriting.  From 2001 to 2008, he served as a freelance producer for a local cable music program, Random Acts of Music.

Biography
Faust was born in Williston, North Dakota, but considers Gillette, Wyoming, his adopted home town . He currently lives with his family in his wife's ancestral home in Ohio—a 140-year-old plot of land signed over to the family by President James K. Polk. He works as a copywriter at an advertising firm while maintaining his career as a freelance writer. He is writing a new novel about UFOs.

Thief Media
On February 16, 2011, Faust announced on his blog that he had created a publishing company called Thief Media as an organ to distribute his out-of-print novels in ebook formats.  Releases began with the Amazon Kindle version of "A Death of Honor" on June 9, the previously unpublished "The Mushroom Shift" on December 12, 2011, and "The Company Man" on July 14, 2012.  Another previously unpublished novel, "Trust" is scheduled to for publication as well.  Faust also announced the completion of a new novel in the same post.

Amazon Kindle Press
On December 13, 2014, Amazon's Kindle Press announced the selection of Faust's thriller "Drawing Down the Moon" from the Kindle Scout program for publication.  As with all Kindle Scout participating writers, Faust had entered his novel into the program the previous month for a 30-day period in which readers could nominate his work.  According to Amazon's Kindle Scout, "Kindle Scout is reader-powered publishing for new, never-before-published books. It's a place where readers help decide if a book gets published."

Drawing Down the Moon 's publication marks the first time Faust has published a novel outside of the science fiction genre (with the exception of his own Thief Media's release of The Mushroom Shift) as well as his first newly written published novel since 1997.

Bibliography

Series

Angel's Luck

• Desperate Measures (1989)
• Precious Cargo (1989)
• The Essence of Evil (1990)

Pembroke Hall

• Ferman's Devils (1996)
• Boddekker's Demons (1997)

Novels
• A Death of Honor (1987)
• The Company Man (1988)
• The Mushroom Shift (2011)
• Drawing Down the Moon (2015)

Plays
• Old Loves Die Hard (1986)

Omnibus editions

• Handling It: How I Got Rich and Famous, Made Media Stars Out of Common Street Scum and Almost Got the Girl (1997) - Science Fiction Book Club edition combining Ferman's Devils and Boddekker's Demons.

Awards
Addy Award (Canton Ad Club) for Copywriting - 1988 - 1997 - 1998

References

External links

Fantastic Fiction author profile
Internet Book List Author profile

20th-century American novelists
21st-century American novelists
American male novelists
American satirists
American science fiction writers
Living people
1957 births
People from Williston, North Dakota
People from Gillette, Wyoming
Writers from Canton, Ohio
Writers from North Dakota
Writers from Wyoming
American male short story writers
20th-century American dramatists and playwrights
American male dramatists and playwrights
20th-century American short story writers
21st-century American short story writers
Journalists from Ohio
20th-century American male writers
21st-century American male writers
Novelists from Ohio
20th-century American non-fiction writers
21st-century American non-fiction writers
American male non-fiction writers
American members of the Churches of Christ